Mirta Teresita Massa (born 1945) is an Argentine model and beauty queen who was the first delegate of Argentina to capture the Miss International crown in 1967.

She became an instant celebrity in her country, gracing parades and fashion magazines. Massa went on to pursue a career as a model, and was also offered some acting opportunities. She eventually took up an interest in painting, and continues to do so upon retirement from modeling.

References

External links

Living people
1945 births
Argentine female models
Miss International winners
Miss International 1967 delegates
Argentine people of Italian descent
Argentine beauty pageant winners
21st-century Argentine women